Gergő Máté (born 13 July 1990 in Kecskemét) is a Hungarian football player who currently plays for Kecskeméti TE.

References 
HLSZ
MLSZ
Kecskemét official website

1990 births
Living people
People from Kecskemét
Hungarian footballers
Association football forwards
Kecskeméti TE players
Sportspeople from Bács-Kiskun County